Alex Stewart Lloyd (born December 28,1984) is a British former motor racing driver. He was close friends with multiple Formula One World Champion Lewis Hamilton during his karting and early career.

Early career
Lloyd was born in Manchester, England. At the age of nine, he began racing karts in the British Super One Championship and the European championship. In 1999, at age 14, he became British Open Champion in the category. In 2000, he began testing Formula Ford cars.

In 2001, he moved into Formula Ford racing achieving a 2nd place at a European Championship round at Spa-Francorchamps. He also finished in 13th place in the prestigious Formula Ford Festival. During the winter he raced in the Formula Renault UK Winter Series reaching 3rd place in the championship. He graduated to the main Formula Renault series in 2002 achieving a 9th place finish in the championship.

During 2003 Lloyd received wider recognition for his ability earning the BRCD McLaren Autosport Young Driver of the Year award. This followed a result of 2nd in the Formula Renault UK championship behind Lewis Hamilton. His second place saw him place ahead of James Rossiter and Mike Conway.

Racing around the world
In 2004, Lloyd conducted his first Formula One test in a McLaren as part of his prize for winning the Young Driver of the Year award the previous year. He was unable to compete in British Formula 3 as planned, due to funding problems. However, he carried out several tests with Alan Docking Racing and teammate Will Power. He took part in the final seven rounds of the Euro Formula 3000 series, recording one win and three pole positions.

However, the lack of financial backing persisted. As a result during 2005 Lloyd had a very limited racing program, taking in 2 races in Italian Formula 3000 for the GP Racing in order to help with car development and a one-off ride in a Formula Renault 3.5 Series event at Monaco. For the winter of 2005–06 he was signed up to drive in A1 Grand Prix for Team Great Britain, however he only undertook one mid-season drive and was never able to race the car, with the GB team opting to give veteran driver Robbie Kerr greater opportunities.

For the 2006 season, Lloyd signed with AFS Racing part way through the year to race the remainder of the whole season in the Indy Pro Series. As a last attempt at providing finance for Lloyd's career, his parents sold their house in Port Soderick in the Isle of Man. Lloyd subsequently qualified second for his first race with the team at St. Petersburg and finished his second race that weekend in third place. In July, he won the road course race at Indianapolis Motor Speedway the day before the United States Grand Prix.  This was the first race AFS Racing had ever won and cemented a friendship with owner Gary Peterson which persists to this day.  Later in the season he won the Valley of the Moon 100 for AFS Racing, held at Infineon Raceway, and went on to finish seventh in the final standings.

For the 2007 IPS season, he drove for Sam Schmidt Motorsports and promptly shattered all records by winning the first five races of the season. He clinched the series championship with his eighth win of the season at Infineon Raceway with two races remaining in the season. During the season he shattered all league records for consecutive wins (5), wins in a season (8), career wins (10) and most points scored (652).  He became the first person ever to have won on both the road course at Indianapolis Motor Speedway and also the famous two and a half-mile oval itself, until Will Power did the same in the Indycar series in 2018.   He also set a record which is unlikely to be beaten - he qualified on the front row for every race where qualifying took place.  

On the basis of this dominating performance, and following an Indycar test, on 17 October 2007, Lloyd was signed as a driver in Chip Ganassi Racing's driver development program. In 2008—unable to raise finance for a full drive with the team—he participated in a limited schedule that includes IndyCar Series and Grand-Am Rolex Sports Car Series Daytona Prototype races and limited Indycar testing.

On 10 April 2008, it was announced that Chip Ganassi Racing and Rahal Letterman Racing would work together to field an entry for Lloyd, for the 2008 Indianapolis 500 on 25 May 2008. Towards the end of the race he crashed heavily, sliding down the pit road and across several teams' pit bays, all of which were empty.

Still without the finance for a full-time drive, Lloyd returned to the 2009 Indianapolis 500, racing for Sam Schmidt Motorsports in partnership with Ganassi. Lloyd was sponsored by HER Energy Drink and wore a hot pink firesuit for the entire month to match his car's distinctive color scheme. This led to Lloyd being given the nickname "Pink Lloyd", after the band Pink Floyd - one of his favorite bands. This and the fact that his wife Samantha was due to give birth to their second daughter on raceday (24 May) brought the Englishman a bit more media attention. With five minutes remaining on Pole Day, Lloyd was able to qualify the car in the 11th position to qualify for his second 500. Lloyd finished 13th after losing a lap early in the race when the car's rear signal light was seen to be broken and Lloyd's car had to pit for the offending light to be replaced. On 2 June their daughter, Bethany Lloyd, was born. Coincidentally, both Lloyd and fellow Firestone Indy Lights graduate Ed Carpenter had children born within the same week as each other.

In 2010 Lloyd teamed with Dale Coyne Racing to drive the number 19 car sponsored by the Boy Scouts of America.  He finished fourth for the team in the 2010 Indianapolis 500, his best performance to date in an IndyCar race. Lloyd would also win the Firestone tire-ific Move of the Race for his performance at Texas, and finished the year as the best of all rookies, thereby winning the Rookie of the Year award.

Still without funding, Lloyd started 2011 without a full-time drive.  However, leading up to the 2011 Indianapolis 500 he was signed again by Dale Coyne's race team, to run not only the 500 but all oval races on the 2011 IndyCar Series schedule, as a counterpart to Sebastian Bourdais (who contested all of the road & street courses).

Since 2012, Lloyd has reviewed production cars for top automotive sites like Jalopnik, Automobile Magazine, Road & Track and Yahoo Autos. He was employed by Yahoo! as the Editor-at-Large of Yahoo Autos.

In 2014, Lloyd competed in three races in the Pirelli World Challenge GT class driving a 2006 Corvette Z06 for CRP Racing. He also won a one-off rally in the B-Spec class at Rally America's Lake Superior Performance Rally (LSPR). On 7 December, Lloyd was victorious in the 2014 25 Hours of Thunderhill endurance race with Davidson Racing, sharing the wheel with Randy Pobst, Kyle Marcelli and Brian Frisselle. The four drove a BMW-powered Norma, becoming the first team in history to win the event in a machine from the "sports racer" ESR class.

Retired from racing now, he has raced cycles for several years, emulating his hero (his father, David) and retains an interest in photography and music (guitar), also emulating his father, an expert in both. 

Lloyd is now a director in California in IT and Content Marketing.

Motorsports career results

American open–wheel racing results
(key) (Races in bold indicate pole position)

Indy Lights

IndyCar 

 1 Run on same day.
 2 Non-points race.
 3 The Las Vegas Indy 300 was abandoned after Dan Wheldon died from injuries sustained in a 15-car crash on lap 11.

Indianapolis 500

Pirelli World Challenge

References

1984 births
Living people
English racing drivers
North American Formula Renault drivers
British Formula Renault 2.0 drivers
Indianapolis 500 drivers
IndyCar Series drivers
Indy Lights champions
Indy Lights drivers
Auto GP drivers
Formula Ford drivers
24 Hours of Daytona drivers
Rolex Sports Car Series drivers
World Series Formula V8 3.5 drivers
Motaworld Racing drivers
Arrow McLaren SP drivers
Rahal Letterman Lanigan Racing drivers
Chip Ganassi Racing drivers
Newman/Haas Racing drivers
Dale Coyne Racing drivers
AFS Racing drivers
DAMS drivers